The First Federal of Sarasota Open, also known as the Virginia Slims of Sarasota,  was a women's tennis tournament played on outdoor green clay courts at the Bath &  Racquet Club in Sarasota, Florida in the United States that was part of the USLTA circuit which was in turn part of the 1973 Commercial Union Grand Prix circuit. It was the inaugural edition of the tournament and was held from April 5 through April 8, 1973. First-seeded Chris Evert won the singles title and earned $5,000 first-prize money.

Finals

Singles
 Chris Evert defeated  Evonne Goolagong 6–3, 6–2
 It was Evert's 4th singles title of the year and the 15th of her career.

Doubles
 Patti Hogan /  Sharon Walsh defeated  Martina Navratilova /  Marie Neumannová 4–6, 6–0, 6–3

Prize money

References

First Federal of Sarasota Open
First Federal of Sarasota Open
First Federal of Sarasota Open
First Federal of Sarasota Open